Primula meadia (syn. Dodecatheon meadia), the shooting star or eastern shooting star, is a species of flowering plant in the primrose family Primulaceae. It is native to the eastern United States and Canada, spanning north from Manitoba and New York, south to Texas and Florida.

It has a wide natural habitat, being found in both forests and prairies. It is most often found in calcareous areas. It can be locally common in some areas of its range, however, it can become rare on its geographic edges.

Description
It blooms in the spring. The flowers are nodding, and form an umbel. Its seeds are dispersed by gusts of wind that shake the erect scapes.

This species is geographically widespread, and has considerable morphological variation across its range. Most southern population have white petals, while northern populations have white to pink, lavender, or magenta petals.

Cultivation
Primula meadia and the white-flowered form P. meadia f. album have both gained the Royal Horticultural Society's Award of Garden Merit.

Primula meadia 'Goliath' is a cultivar that grows larger flowers on taller scapes.

References

meadia
Flora of North America
Plants described in 1753
Taxa named by Carl Linnaeus